Julian Roman Pölsler (born 1954) is an Austrian film director, theatre director, and screenwriter. Pölsler was born on the Kreuzberg mountain above the village of Sankt Lorenzen im Paltental in Styria, Austria. He studied film directing and production at the University of Music and Performing in Vienna. He also studied directing and dramaturgy at the Institute for Cultural Management in the Max Reinhardt Seminar, after which he worked as an assistant director to Axel Corti.

In 1982, he began directing television films and operas. Since 2003, Pölsler has held teaching positions in the drama department at the Konservatorium Wien and in the computer science and media department at the Vienna University of Technology. In 2006, he became theatre director  at Klosterneuburg. Pölsler lives and works in Vienna and Munich. His most recent feature film The Wall won the Prize of the Ecumenical Jury at the Berlin International Film Festival in 2012, and was selected as the Austrian entry for the Best Foreign Language Film at the 86th Academy Awards.

Filmography

References

External links
 

Austrian film directors
Austrian television directors
Austrian theatre directors
Austrian opera directors
University of Music and Performing Arts Vienna alumni
Academic staff of TU Wien
1954 births
Living people